Tianjin University of Traditional Chinese Medicine (天津中医药大学 in Chinese) is  a university in Tianjin, China, under the municipal government. Specialized in traditional Chinese Medicine, it is selected by the Chinese state Double First-Class University, included in the national Double First Class University Plan.

See also 
Japan Campus of Foreign Universities

References 

Universities and colleges in Tianjin
Traditional Chinese medicine
Medical and health organizations based in China